The Tamsui Fisherman's Wharf, officially the Tamsui Second Fishing Harbor, is a major fishing harbor and a scenic spot on the right bank of the Tamsui River estuary, at the western tip of Tamsui District, New Taipei City, Taiwan. The predecessor was the Tamsui Customs Wharf, a more inland but important fishing harbor in the early history of north Taiwan.

Facilities
Tamsui Lover's Bridge: Lover Bridge of Tamsui, a white-colored Cable-stayed bridge, derived its name since it was opened on 14 February 2003, Valentine's Day. You may appreciate the sunset from the bridge. The total length is approximately 196 meters and the walk across takes approximately 3 minutes.
Outdoor Lawn and Sculpture Park
Fluctuation Fishing Boat Wharf: with anchorage for up to 150 fishing boats.
Riverbanks Scenery Platform: maximum capacity of 3,000 people with views of the Tamsui river and Kuanyinshan.

Transportation
 Take the Taipei Metro Tamsui Line to Tamsui Station, and then transfer to Bus Red-26, 836, or 837.
 Tamsui Fisherman's Wharf Station of the Danhai light rail.

See also
 List of tourist attractions in Taiwan
 Port of Taipei

External links

 Tamsui Fisherman's Wharf

Buildings and structures in New Taipei
Tourist attractions in New Taipei
Wharves in Taiwan